Beltzhoover is a neighborhood in southern Pittsburgh, Pennsylvania, in an area known as the South Hills.

The area is named for Melchior Beltzhoover who was a tradesman there in the early 19th century.  The community borders McKinley Park. The neighborhood lies in the 18th ward and is predominantly an African-American neighborhood. The area has commonly been referred as up and coming, due to fact that the crime rate has decreased tremendously over the past 10 years. 

The neighborhood is currently the subject of a revitalization effort by local organizations, such as the Beltzhoover Consensus Group, the Hilltop Housing Initiative, and the Urban Redevelopment Authority.  In hopes to reestablish the business districts, maintain current  homeowners and create new homeowners by rehabbing current vacant homes.  The Beltzhoover School, 60,000 sq ft, was recently purchased by the BCG  and will be renovated in the next several years to boost the economy of Beltzhoover.

Surrounding neighborhoods
Beltzhoover has four Pittsburgh neighborhood borders, including Mount Washington to the north and west, Allentown to the upper east, Knoxville to the mid and lower east, and Bon Air to the south and southwest.

See also
List of Pittsburgh neighborhoods

References

Further reading

External links

Beltzhoover Neighborhood Map
Beltzhoover Neighborhood

Neighborhoods in Pittsburgh